The Kansallinen Liiga ('National League') is the premier division of women's football in Finland. It was previously called the Jalkapallon naisten SM-sarja ('Women's Football Finnish Championship Series') during 1974 to 2006 and the Naisten Liiga ('Women's League') during 2006 to 2019, The first season under the name Kansallinen Liiga was played in 2020.

Teams 2022 

Source: Suomen Palloliitto (Finnish Football Association)

List of champions 
Vantaa were Naisten Liiga Finnish Champions four times, Helsingin Jalkapalloklubi have won the most Finnish Champion women's titles.

Kansallinen Liiga champions 2020– 
 2020 – Åland United
 2021 – KuPS

Naisten Liiga champions 2007–2019
 2007 – FC Honka
 2008 – FC Honka
 2009 – Åland United
 2010 – PK-35 Vantaa
 2011 – PK-35 Vantaa
 2012 – PK-35 Vantaa
 2013 – Åland United
 2014 – PK-35 Vantaa
 2015 – PK-35 Vantaa
 2016 – PK-35 Vantaa
 2017 – FC Honka
 2018 – PK-35 Vantaa
 2019 – Helsingin Jalkapalloklubi

Naisten SM-sarja champions 1971–2006 
Previous champions of Finland.

 1971 – Helsingin Jalkapalloklubi
 1972 – Helsingin Jalkapalloklubi 
 1973 – Helsingin Jalkapalloklubi
 1974 – Helsingin Jalkapalloklubi
 1975 – Helsingin Jalkapalloklubi
 1976 – Kemin Into
 1977 – Kemin Into
 1978 – TPS Turku
 1979 – Helsingin Jalkapalloklubi
 1980 – Helsingin Jalkapalloklubi
 1981 – Helsingin Jalkapalloklubi
 1982 – Puotinkylän Valtti
 1983 – Puotinkylän Valtti
 1984 – Helsingin Jalkapalloklubi
 1985 – Kaunis Nainen Futis
 1986 – Helsingin Jalkapalloklubi
 1987 – Helsingin Jalkapalloklubi
 1988 – Helsingin Jalkapalloklubi
 1989 – PP-Futis
 1990 – Helsinki United
 1991 – Helsingin Jalkapalloklubi
 1992 – Helsingin Jalkapalloklubi
 1993 – Kontulan Urheilijat
 1994 – Malmin Palloseura
 1995 – Helsingin Jalkapalloklubi
 1996 – Helsingin Jalkapalloklubi
 1997 – Helsingin Jalkapalloklubi
 1998 – Helsingin Jalkapalloklubi
 1999 – Helsingin Jalkapalloklubi
 2000 – Helsingin Jalkapalloklubi
 2001 – Helsingin Jalkapalloklubi
 2002 – FC United 
 2003 – Malmin Palloseura
 2004 – FC United
 2005 – Helsingin Jalkapalloklubi
 2006 – FC Honka

Top scorers 2007–present

See also 
 Football Association of Finland

References 
Content in this article is translated from the existing Finnish Wikipedia article at :fi:Kansallinen Liiga; see its history for attribution.

External links 
 Kansallinen Liiga official homepage
 Finnish league at women.soccerway.com

 
1
Summer association football leagues
Sports leagues established in 2007
Fin
Professional sports leagues in Finland